The Lalkhanabad village is the center of Qarghayi District of Laghman Province, Afghanistan.

Populated places in Laghman Province